Acacia alleniana is a shrub or tree belonging to the genus Acacia and the subgenus Phyllodineae endemic to northern parts of Australia.

Description
It has pendulous branches and red-brown coloured slender branchlets. The simple inflorescences have spherical flower-heads that contain around 35 yellow coloured flowers. The linear brown seed pods that form after flowering are raised over the seeds alternately.

Taxonomy
The species was first formally described by the botanists A.J.Ewart and O.B.Davies in 1917 as part of the work by Joseph Maiden Appendix IV: Acacias of the Northern Territory as published in The Flora of the Northern Territory. It was reclassified as Racosperma allenianum by Leslie Pedley in 1987 then transferred back to the genus Acacia in 2001. The shrub is often misidentified as Acacia juncifolia and also as Acacia tenuissima.
The species is closely related to Acacia jasperensis and Acacia juncifolia.

Distribution
It is native in the Northern Territory from around Darwin south and east in Arnhem Land and on many of the islands in the Gulf of Carpentaria. Its range extends into far north-western Queensland where it is found on hills and sandstone slopes growing in skeletal sandy soils.

See also
List of Acacia species

References

alleniana
Flora of the Northern Territory
Flora of Queensland
Plants described in 1917
Taxa named by Joseph Maiden